Peter Smith (born 18 November 1964) is a Scottish curler. He played second for David Murdoch from 2006 to 2010, including curling at the 2010 Winter Olympics.

Smith started curling in 1979. He plays in second position and is right-handed. He has won many prizes in his career, but never featured on the Winter Olympics medal podium. Peter Smith was the tallest male curler at the 2010 Winter Olympics at 6"2. He is nicknamed "Pistol Pete" for his notable accuracy.

He is the brother of curler David Smith and the uncle of curlers Kyle Smith and Cameron Smith.

References

External links
 
 Video: 

1964 births
Living people
Scottish male curlers
British male curlers
Olympic curlers of Great Britain
Curlers at the 2010 Winter Olympics
World curling champions
European curling champions
Continental Cup of Curling participants